Milkman is an album by the folk singer-songwriter Phranc, released in 1998. It was her first album in seven years; she had spent several years putting on her Neil Diamond tribute act, Hot August Phranc.

The album was nominated for a GLAAD Media Award, in the "Outstanding Music - Album" category.

Production
"Gary" is a song about Phranc's brother, who was murdered in 1991. "Ozzie and Harriet" tells of a one-on-one faltering relationship. "Tzena, Tzena" is sung in Yiddish. 

The album title references Phranc's fondness for regularly wearing a milkman's uniform.

Critical reception
The Los Angeles Times wrote that "with its minimalist, sincere folk-pop tunes, Phranc’s first album in seven years integrates the humor and pain in her recent life."

Track listing
All tracks composed by Phranc; except where indicated
 "Twirly" – 1:48 
 "The Handsome Cabin Boy" (Traditional) – 3:04 
 "Ozzie and Harriet" – 3:37 
 "Yer the One" – 1:42 
 "They Lied" – 2:26 
 "Where Were You?" – 4:28 
 "Gary" – 2:31 
 "Cuffs" – 3:48 
 "Lullaby" – 1:59 
 "Tzena, Tzena" (Traditional) – 1:28

Personnel

 Phranc - Producer, vocals, arranger, guitar
 Warren Bruleigh - Producer
 Anna Waronker - Backing vocals
 Phil Parlapiano - Accordion
 Steve McDonald - Bass guitar
 Tal Bergman - Drums
 Jimmy Sloan - Engineer
 Jeff Skelton - Assistant engineer
 Bill Inglot - Mastering
 Dave Schultz - Mastering
 Howie Idelson - Design
 Rocky Schenck - Photography

References

Milkman
Milkman